Nadia Nadarajah is a deaf British actress. She has labelled herself as English South Asian woman with dark skin. She uses British Sign Language.

Biography 
Nadarajah attended Mary Hare Grammar School. At 21 she moved to Australia, where she joined the committee of the SAAD (South-Australian Association of the Deaf) and campaigned on several issues. She worked as a teacher of the Deaf.

She trained as an actress at the International Visual Theatre in Paris in physical and bilingual acting. After spending three years teaching Sign Language on Reunion Island, she returned to the UK. She has appeared in Deafinitely Theatre productions including Shakespearean plays such as Love's Labour's Lost and A Midsummer Night's Dream, and other plays like Grounded.

Other credits include Can I start again Please, Tanika's Journey and A Christmas Carol.

Nadarajah is fluent in five sign languages (British, French, Australian, American and French Creole).

References

External links

Living people
English deaf people
BSL users
Year of birth missing (living people)
21st-century English actresses
English people of Sri Lankan descent
Australian people of Sri Lankan descent